Enumclaw is an American indie rock band from Tacoma, Washington. The band is named after the city of Enumclaw, Washington. In February 2022, the band was signed to Luminelle Recordings, an imprint of Fat Possum Records.

References 

American indie rock groups
Musical groups from Washington (state)
Musical groups from Tacoma, Washington